Longhoughton is a small rural village in Northumberland, England.

The village lies under the spectacular whinstone outcrop, Ratcheugh Crag, near which local point-to-point racing is often conducted.

Longhoughton church does double-duty as the church of the nearby RAF Boulmer.

History
The village has a turbulent history and was often sacked in Medieval times. From the 12th century until recently, the village was noted for its water and corn mills.

There was local industry based on limestone, coal and lead; although agriculture was always the main occupation.

On top of Ratcheugh Crag is the Robert Adam-designed Ratcheugh Observatory, built by Hugh Percy, 1st Duke of Northumberland.

Governance 
Longhoughton is in the parliamentary constituency of Berwick-upon-Tweed. The MP for this constituency is currently Anne-Marie Trevelyan, the Conservative candidate who was elected in 2015. An electoral ward in the same name exists. This ward stretches north along the coast and east to Powburn. The ward has a total population taken at the 2011 census of 4,424.

Transport 
Longhoughton once had a railway station on the main line of the North East Railway.

Buildings 
The parish church of St. Peter and St. Paul dates from the Saxon era, although it was rebuilt in 1080 and now the only remaining Saxon stonework is seen in parts of the chancel and tower arches. During the 1080 rebuilding, a  tower was added. This was for purposes of military defence, rather than religious use, and was used as such until the 17th century. Parish records go back as far as 1646.

Smugglers used to use the church as a distribution centre in the 19th century. Nikolaus Pevsner mentioned the building favourably in his review of Northumbrian architecture.

A little over a mile to the north-west is Littlehoughton Hall, a house of 1686 with later additions, which incorporates the remains of a late medieval tower house.

Freedom of the Parish
The following people and military units have received the Freedom of the Parish of Longhoughton.

Individuals
 Eleanor Phillips: 3 November 2022.

References

External links

GENUKI (accessed: 26 November 2008) 	
Northumberland Communities (accessed: 26 November 2008)

 
Villages in Northumberland
Civil parishes in Northumberland